Alyona Aleksandrovna  Khmelnitskaya (born 12 January 1971) is a Russian stage and film actress and TV presenter.

Biography
Khmelnitskaya was born in Moscow, Russian SFSR, Soviet Union (now Russia), into an artistic family. Her parents are artists of the ballet. Her father Aleksandr Khmelnitsky (born 1937) and mother Valentina Savina (born 1939) danced at the Bolshoi Theater for twenty years. Alyona in childhood was engaged in artistic gymnastics and table tennis.

In 1988, after graduating from high school, she entered the acting department of the Moscow Art Theater School (course leader Ivan Tarkhanov), graduating in 1992. Graduates of the same course were Gosha Kutsenko and Vyacheslav Razbegaev. In 1990-1994 she played Konchita in the play Juno and Avos at the Lenkom.

Khmelnitskaya's main performance was in the role of Leoncia Solano in the Russian-Ukrainian adventure feature film directed by Vladimir Popkov, Hearts of Three  (1992), based on Jack London's novel of the same name.

In 1993, she married film director Tigran Keosayan. In a marriage that lasted twenty-one years, two daughters were born. The couple divorced in 2014, and after the divorce they maintained friendly relations.

Since 2016, she has been in a relationship with Aleksandr Sinyushin who is thirteen years her junior.

Selected filmography

References

External links

1971 births
Living people
Soviet film actresses
Russian film actresses
Soviet stage actresses
Russian stage actresses
Russian television actresses
Russian television presenters
Actresses from Moscow
Russian women television presenters
Moscow Art Theatre School alumni